In Greek mythology, Pandion II ( or ; Ancient Greek: Πανδίων) was a legendary King of Athens, the son and heir of King Cecrops II and his wife Metiadusa, daughter of Eupalamus.

Family 
Pandion was the father of Aegeus, Pallas, Nisos, Lycus and the wife of Sciron by Pylia, daughter of King Pylas of Megara.

Mythology 
Pandion II was the eighth king of Athens in the traditional line of succession as given by the third century BC Parian Chronicle, the chronographer Castor of Rhodes (probably from the late third-century Eratosthenes) and the Bibliotheca. He was preceded by Cecrops I, Cranaus, Amphictyon, Erichthonius, Pandion I, Erechtheus, and Cecrops II, and succeeded by Aegeus and Theseus. Castor gives his reign as 25 years (1307/6–1282/1). Originally there may have been a single Pandion, and either Pandion I or Pandion II may have been a later invention in order to fill a gap in the mythical history of Athens. Pausanias calls this Pandion the father of Procne and Philomela, usually considered to be the daughters of Pandion I.

Pandion was exiled from Athens by the sons of his uncle Metion who sought to put Metion on the throne. Pandion fled to Megara where he married Pylia, daughter of King Pylas. Later, Pylas went into voluntary exile to Messenia, because he had killed his uncle, Bias. Pylas then arranged for his son-in-law to be king of Megara. Pylia bore Pandion his four sons. When Pandion died at Megara, Nisos succeeded him as king. He had a hero shrine at Megara at the Bluff of Athene the Diver-bird. After this death, his other sons returned to Athens and drove out the sons of Metion, putting Aegeus on the throne.

Either Pandion II or Pandion I was usually identified with Pandion, the eponymous hero of the Attic tribe Pandionis.

See also
Sanctuary of Pandion

Notes

References
 Apollodorus, The Library with an English Translation by Sir James George Frazer, F.B.A., F.R.S. in 2 Volumes, Cambridge, MA, Harvard University Press; London, William Heinemann Ltd. 1921. ISBN 0-674-99135-4. Online version at the Perseus Digital Library. Greek text available from the same website.
 Gantz, Timothy, Early Greek Myth: A Guide to Literary and Artistic Sources, Johns Hopkins University Press, 1996, Two volumes:  (Vol. 1),  (Vol. 2).

 Harding, Phillip, The Story of Athens: The Fragments of the Local Chronicles of Attika, Routledge, 2007. .
 Herodotus; Histories, A. D. Godley (translator), Cambridge: Harvard University Press, 1920; . Online version at the Perseus Digital Library.
 Kearns, Emily, The Heroes of Attica (Bulletin Supplement 57), University of London Institute of Classical Studies 1989. .
 Pausanias, Description of Greece with an English Translation by W.H.S. Jones, Litt.D., and H.A. Ormerod, M.A., in 4 Volumes. Cambridge, MA, Harvard University Press; London, William Heinemann Ltd. 1918. . Online version at the Perseus Digital Library
Pausanias, Graeciae Descriptio. 3 vols. Leipzig, Teubner. 1903.  Greek text available at the Perseus Digital Library.
 Smith, William; A Dictionary of Greek and Roman Antiquities. William Smith, LLD. William Wayte. G. E. Marindin. Albemarle Street, London. John Murray. 1890. Online version at the Perseus Digital Library.
 Strabo, The Geography of Strabo. Edition by H.L. Jones. Cambridge, Mass.: Harvard University Press; London: William Heinemann, Ltd. 1924. Online version at the Perseus Digital Library.
Strabo, Geographica edited by A. Meineke. Leipzig: Teubner. 1877. Greek text available at the Perseus Digital Library.

Princes in Greek mythology
Kings of Athens
Kings in Greek mythology
Attican characters in Greek mythology
Ancient Megara